The 2017–18 Verbandspokal, (English: 2017–18 Association Cup) consisted of twenty-one regional cup competitions, the Verbandspokale, the qualifying competition for the 2018–19 DFB-Pokal, the German Cup.

All clubs from the Regionalliga and below could enter the regional Verbandspokale, subject to the rules and regulations of each region. Clubs from the Bundesliga and 2. Bundesliga could not enter but were instead directly qualified for the first round of the DFB-Pokal. Reserve teams were not permitted to take part in the DFB-Pokal or the Verbandspokale. The precise rules of each regional Verbandspokal are laid down by the regional football association organising it.

All twenty-one winners qualified for the first round of the German Cup in the following season.

Competitions
The finals of the 2017–18 Verbandspokal competitions (winners listed in bold):

References

External links
Official DFB website  The German Football Association
Fussball.de  Official results website of the DFB

2017–18 in German football cups
Verbandspokal seasons